Giuseppe Felice Barlacci (1633 – 27 November 1708) was a Roman Catholic prelate who served as Bishop of Narni (1683–1690).

Biography
Giuseppe Felice Barlacci was born in Rome, Italy in 1633. On 24 May 1683, he was appointed during the papacy of Pope Innocent XI as Bishop of Narni. On 30 May 1683, he was consecrated bishop by Alessandro Crescenzi (cardinal), Cardinal-Priest of Santa Prisca, with Francesco Casati, Titular Archbishop of Trapezus, and Francesco de' Marini, Titular Archbishop of Amasea, serving as co-consecrators. He served as Bishop of Narni until his resignation on 1 May 1690. He died on 27 November 1708.

Episcopal succession
While bishop, he was the principal co-consecrator of:

See also 
Catholic Church in Italy

References

External links and additional sources
 (Chronology of Bishops) 
 (Chronology of Bishops) 

17th-century Italian Roman Catholic bishops
Bishops appointed by Pope Innocent XI
1633 births
1708 deaths